Mzwandile Ngubeni (born 1982) - South African film and theater actor. He is known for playing in a movie "In Desert and Wilderness" (2001) of a director Gavin Hood. In the film he starred alongside other South African actress, Lungile Shongwe. In preparation for the role of Kali - just like Lungile Shongwe - he had to learn Polish dialogues, although he did not know before the Polish language.

Filmography
 2001 Witness to a Kill - as Bellhop
 2001 In Desert and Wilderness - as Kali
 2001 In Desert and Wilderness (TV mini-series) - as Kali
 2008 Jerusalema - as Young Bull
 2009 Qudhmun Adeerkii - as a police officer Nageeye War
 2010 MsX Bodyguards - as a friendly shopkeeper
 2011 Waalane Weeji - as a foreigner

References

External links
 Mzwandile Ngubeni in Filmweb (PL)

1982 births
South African male film actors
Living people
South African male stage actors
South African male television actors
21st-century South African male actors